EDOC is an abbreviation for multiple terms:

 Encuentros del Otro Cine, an international documentary film festival held annually in Ecuador
 Enterprise Distributed Object Computing, a standard of the Object Management Group
 Edoc is short for "electronic document". It is a slang term for an etext